Zaandijk Zaanse Schans railway station, until 2016 Koog-Zaandijk railway station, is a railway station in Koog aan de Zaan and Zaandijk, both neighbourhoods of the municipality of Zaandam, Netherlands. It is also the closest railway station to Zaanse Schans. The station opened on 1 November 1869 and is located on the Den Helder–Amsterdam railway between Zaandam and Uitgeest.

Renovation
When the old cargo platform was destroyed in 1976, the station gained a partial roof and an inside ticket and service kiosk. As automated ticketing machines proliferated in stations starting in 1980, smaller municipal stations like Zaandijk Zaanse Schans gradually phased out their use of ticket and service kiosks. Following the closure of the stations kiosk, it was left with minimal care and no facilities and was in need of modernisation and renovation. The station finished renovations in 2016, making it more accessible for people with disabilities. Three elevators have been installed, as well as disability-friendly toilets and special slopes to get in and out of trains. The waiting room has been redone, is heated and contains a minor food and gift shop. Train tickets are only available from ticket machines on the platform.

Station Name
Zaandijk Zaanse Schans station, being on the border of the two towns Zaandijk and Koog aan de Zaan and bordering 4 neighbourhoods (Old-Zaandijk, Rooswijk, Old-Koog aan de Zaan and Westerkoog) has shared the name since opening. Following renovations, local councilman Addy Verschuren stated the station should be renamed from Koog Zaandijk to fit the local tourist-attraction Zaanse Schans. Suggesting the name Zaandijk Zaanse Schans, to give visitors a better understanding on where to get off. The name change has been approved, and on 11 December 2016 the name was changed.

Train services
The following train services call at Zaandijk Zaanse Schans:
2x per hour local service (sprinter) Uitgeest – Zaandam – Amsterdam – Woerden – Rotterdam (all day, every day)
2x per hour local service (sprinter) Uitgeest – Zaandam – Amsterdam – Utrecht – Rhenen (only on weekdays until 8:00PM)

Bus services
The station also has a Bus-stop, 3 Services make their stop here. During rail-disruptions, NS may run buses from these stops.

References

External links
NS website 
Dutch Public Transport journey planner 
Timetable train services Zaandijk Zaanse Schans 

Railway stations in North Holland
Railway stations opened in 1869
Railway stations on the Staatslijn K
1869 establishments in the Netherlands
Railway stations in the Netherlands opened in the 19th century